Wanyá McCoy (born March 29, 2003) is a Bahamian sprinter from the Berry Islands in The Bahamas. He attended Queen's College High School in Nassau, Bahamas, before going on to compete for Clemson University.

Personal bests

References

External links
 Wanya MCCOY | Profile | World Athletics
 Wanya McCoy Clemson Profile

2003 births
Living people
Bahamian male sprinters